Correo del Sur is a daily newspaper published in Sucre, Bolivia. The paper serves for the departments of Chuquisaca, Potosí, and Tarija.

References

External links
 Official website

Mass media in Sucre
Newspapers published in Bolivia
Publications with year of establishment missing
Spanish-language newspapers